This is a list of recreational number theory topics (see number theory, recreational mathematics). Listing here is not pejorative: many famous topics in number theory have origins in challenging problems posed purely for their own sake.

See list of number theory topics for pages dealing with aspects of number theory with more consolidated theories.

Number sequences

Integer sequence
Fibonacci sequence
Golden mean base
Fibonacci coding
Lucas sequence
Padovan sequence
Figurate numbers
Polygonal number
Triangular number
Square number
Pentagonal number
Hexagonal number
Heptagonal number
Octagonal number
Nonagonal number
Decagonal number
Centered polygonal number
Centered square number
Centered pentagonal number
Centered hexagonal number
Tetrahedral number
Pyramidal number
Triangular pyramidal number
Square pyramidal number
Pentagonal pyramidal number
Hexagonal pyramidal number
Heptagonal pyramidal number
Octahedral number
Star number
Perfect number
Quasiperfect number
Almost perfect number
Multiply perfect number
Hyperperfect number
Semiperfect number
Primitive semiperfect number
Unitary perfect number
Weird number
Untouchable number
Amicable number
Sociable number
Abundant number
Deficient number
Amenable number
Aliquot sequence
Super-Poulet number
Lucky number
Powerful number
Primeval number
Palindromic number
Triangular square number
Harmonic divisor number
Sphenic number
Smith number
Double Mersenne number
Zeisel number
Heteromecic number
Niven numbers
Superparticular number
Highly composite number
Highly totient number
Practical number
Juggler sequence
Look-and-say sequence

Digits

Polydivisible number
Automorphic number
Armstrong number
Self number
Harshad number
Keith number
Kaprekar number
Digit sum
Persistence of a number
Perfect digital invariant
Happy number
Perfect digit-to-digit invariant
Factorion
Emirp
Palindromic prime
Home prime
Normal number
Stoneham number
Champernowne constant
Absolutely normal number
Repunit
Repdigit

Prime and related sequences

Semiprime
Almost prime
Unique prime
Factorial prime
Permutable prime
Palindromic prime
Cuban prime
Lucky prime

Magic squares, etc.

Ulam spiral
Magic star
Magic square
Frénicle standard form
Prime reciprocal magic square
Trimagic square
Multimagic square
Panmagic square
Satanic square
Most-perfect magic square
Geometric magic square
Conway's Lux method for magic squares
Magic cube
Perfect magic cube
Semiperfect magic cube
Bimagic cube
Trimagic cube
Multimagic cube
Magic hypercube
Magic constant
Squaring the square

Recreational number theory